The Marcus Beebe House, in Ipswich, South Dakota, is a historic house built in 1910.  It was listed on the National Register of Historic Places in 1976.

It was designed by architect J.W. Henry.  It is a two-and-a-half-story house built in a combination of Queen Anne and Classical Revival styles.  Its two-story entrance portico originally included four Ionic columns, but had one column replaced by a square brick pillar and lost the capital off another.

References

Houses on the National Register of Historic Places in South Dakota
Queen Anne architecture in South Dakota
Neoclassical architecture in South Dakota
Houses completed in 1910
Edmunds County, South Dakota